Drienovo is a village and municipality in the Krupina District of the Banská Bystrica Region of Slovakia.

History
In historical records, the village was first mentioned in 1256 (Drino) when it belonged to Čabraď Castle. After, in the order, it passed to families Bakócy (16th century), Erdődy, Pálffy, Krusics (Krupina’s Captains), Koháry and Coburg.

Genealogical resources

The records for genealogical research are available at the state archive "Statny Archiv in Banska Bystrica, Nitra, Slovakia"

 Roman Catholic church records (births/marriages/deaths): 1800-1895 (parish B)
 Lutheran church records (births/marriages/deaths): 1728-1896 (parish A)

See also
 List of municipalities and towns in Slovakia

External links
 
https://web.archive.org/web/20071116010355/http://www.statistics.sk/mosmis/eng/run.html.  
http://www.e-obce.sk/obec/drienovo/drienovo.html
https://web.archive.org/web/20070425204202/http://www.regionhont.sk/index.php?session=0&action=read&click=open&article=1103472998
Surnames of living people in Drienovo

Villages and municipalities in Krupina District